The East Metropolitan Region is a multi-member electoral region of the Western Australian Legislative Council, located in the eastern and south-eastern suburbs of Perth. It was created by the Acts Amendment (Electoral Reform) Act 1987, and became effective on 22 May 1989 with five members who had been elected at the 1989 state election three months earlier. At the 2008 election, it was increased to six members.

Legislation to abolish the region, along with all other Western Australian Electoral Regions was passed in November 2021, with the 2025 state election to use a single state-wide electorate of 37 members.

Geography
The Region is made up of several complete Legislative Assembly districts, which change at each distribution.

Representation

Distribution of seats

Members
Since its creation, the electorate has had 21 members. Two of the members elected in 1989 had previously been members for the North-East Metropolitan Province (Fred McKenzie and Tom Butler) and one had previously been a member for the South-East Metropolitan Province (Kay Hallahan) of the Legislative Council.

Election results

2021

2017

References

East Metropolitan